Hyperalonia morio is a species of bee flies in the family Bombyliidae.

Description
Hyperalonia morio is a large bee fly with a bluish black body and a yellow head. Wings are dark bluish, with hyaline areas.

Biology
Hyperalonia morio are flower feeders, subsisting on pollen and nectar. These bombyliid flies are only parasitic flies, mainly projecting the eggs into the nest opening of Rubrica nasuta while they are in flight. The 1st instar larvae overwinter feeding on the larvae of their hosts until the following spring.

Distribution
This species is the most widely distributed in South America. It is present in Argentina, Bolivia, Brazil, Chile, Paraguay and Uruguay.

References 

 Systema Dipterorum. Pape T. & Thompson F.C. (eds)

External links
 Diptera.info

Bombyliidae
Diptera of South America
Insects described in 1775
Taxa named by Johan Christian Fabricius